Becca R. Levy is a Professor of Epidemiology (Social and Behavioral Sciences) at Yale School of Public Health and Professor of Psychology at Yale University. She is a leading researcher in the fields of social gerontology and psychology of aging. She is credited with creating the field of how age stereotypes, which are assimilated from the culture, impact the health of older individuals. The Dean of Columbia School of Public Health describes Levy as "a pioneer" in the "growing body of impressive research showing that our attitudes toward aging affect our health, our resilience in the face of adversity, and our very survival."

Career

Levy was born in Atlanta, GA. She studied psychology and Near Eastern studies at the University of Michigan, where she received a BA with Highest Distinction. Next she received her MA and PhD in Psychology from Harvard University. She trained as a postdoctoral fellow at Harvard Medical School in the Division on Aging and Department of Social Medicine. Levy then became Assistant Professor at the Yale School of Public Health. She is now Professor and Director of the Laboratory of Psychosocial Determinants of Aging Health at the Yale School of Public Health. She is also a Professor in the Department of Psychology at Yale University.

Levy has created an area of research that focuses on the extent to which the aging process is a product of society. She has examined this in a series of innovative studies that demonstrate culture-based positive and negative age stereotypes of older persons have beneficial and detrimental influences, respectively, on a wide range of health conditions. Her research has demonstrated that several of the adverse health conditions assumed to be solely and inevitably a result of aging are, in fact, influenced by negative age stereotypes.

Levy's studies also show that positive age stereotypes can benefit the health of older persons. Her finding that positive age beliefs can increase older persons' longevity has become one of the most cited findings about old age.  She has also demonstrated that positive age stereotypes can be enhanced and negative age stereotypes can be diminished through interventions.

This body of research has formed the basis for her stereotype embodiment theory (SET), which posits that the age stereotypes of one's culture are internalized from childhood, reinforced throughout the lifespan, eventually become self-relevant, and then influence health in old age through psychological, behavioral, and physiological pathways. According to SET, these stereotypes can operate implicitly. Levy and Mahzarin Banaji are credited with coining the term "implicit ageism".

Levy's research findings about the impact of age stereotypes on older persons' health have been reproduced by scientists in five continents and supported by numerous meta-analyses. Her ground-breaking studies utilize a variety of complementary methodologies, including experimental, longitudinal, and cross-cultural approaches.

Levy has contributed over 130 articles and chapters to psychological, gerontological, and medical journals and books. Her research has been supported by the National Institute on Aging, National Heart, Lung, and Blood Institute, National Science Foundation, Donaghue Medical Research Foundation, and Brookdale Foundation.

Levy's studies have had a real-world impact on improving the well-being of older persons. She conducted the first study to show the economic impact of ageism on the health of older persons. In that study it was found that the financial cost of ageism on health in one year in the United States was $63 billion. She testified before the  U.S. Senate Special Committee on Aging about the harmful impact of ageism in popular media and marketing. Her findings provided the basis for amicus briefs in age-discrimination cases at the U.S. Supreme Court. The American Psychological Association advocated a historic resolution against ageism that used her research as an evidence base, citing 11 of her studies. The practical applications of Levy's research have extended beyond the U.S. For instance, her findings provided the rationale for a World Health Organization Campaign to End Ageism, supported by 194 countries, in which she is a scientific advisor.

Her studies on health and aging has been featured in national media, such as The New York Times, and NPR, CNN Health, The Wall Street Journal, U.S. News & World Report, and Times Magazine, as well as international media, such as The Guardian, Der Spiegel, and the BBC.

Awards
Baltes Distinguished Research Achievement Award for Exceptional Theoretical and Empirical Contributions to the Psychological Science of Aging from the American Psychological Association
Scholar Award for Research Related to Disadvantaged Older Adults (Gerontological Society of America and Senior Service America)
Ewald W. Busse Research Award for Excellence in Social Behavioral Sciences (International Association of Gerontology and Geriatrics)
 Donaghue Investigator Award (Patrick and Catherine Weldon Donaghue Medical Research Foundation)
Margret M. Baltes Award for Outstanding Early Career Achievement in Social and Behavioral Gerontology (Margret M. and Paul Baltes Foundation and the Gerontological Society of America)
Springer Award for Early Career Achievement in Research on Adult Development and Aging (American Psychological Association)
Brookdale National Fellowship for Leadership in Aging (Brookdale Foundation)
International Mensa Foundation New Investigator Award for Excellence in Research
Gordon W. Allport Award (Harvard University)
Richard Kalish Innovative Publication Award (Gerontological Society of America)

Selected publications

Levy, B. (1996). Improving memory in old age by implicit self-stereotyping. Journal of Personality and Social Psychology, 71, 1092-1107.
Levy, B. R. (2009). Stereotype embodiment: A psychosocial approach to aging. Current Directions in Psychological Science, 18, 332-336.
Levy, B. R. (2017). Age-stereotype paradox: A need and opportunity for social change. The Gerontologist, 57, 118-126.
Levy, B. R., Ferrucci, L., Zonderman, A. B.; Slade, M. D., Troncoso, J., & Resnick, S. M. (2016). A culture–brain link: Negative age stereotypes predict Alzheimer's disease biomarkers. Psychology and Aging, 31, 82-88.
Levy, B. R., Pilver, C., Chung, P. H., & Slade, M. D. (2014). Subliminal strengthening: Improving older individuals' physical function over time with an implicit-age-stereotype intervention. Psychological Science, 25, 2127-2135.
Levy, B. R., Slade, M., Kunkel, S., & Kasl, S. (2002). Longevity increased by positive self-perceptions of aging. Journal of Personality and Social Psychology, 83, 261-270.
Levy, B. R., Slade, M. D., Murphy, T. E., & Gill, T. M. (2012). Association between positive age stereotypes and recovery from disability in older persons. JAMA, 308, 1972-1973.
Levy, B. R., Slade, M. D., Pietrzak, R. H., & Ferrucci, L. (2018). Positive age beliefs protect against dementia even among elders with high-risk gene. PLOS ONE, 13, e191004.
Levy, B. R., Zonderman, A., Slade, M. D., Ferrucci, L. (2009). Negative age stereotypes held earlier in life predict cardiovascular events in later life. Psychological Science, 20, 296-8.

References

External links
 YSPH Profile: Becca R. Levy

American women psychologists
American social psychologists
Yale University faculty
University of Michigan alumni
Harvard University alumni
Year of birth missing (living people)
Living people
American women academics
21st-century American women